Scott Stuber (born December 13, 1968) is an American film producer and Chairman of Netflix Film.

Career
After graduating from University of Arizona with a film degree, Stuber worked at Universal Pictures as a publicity assistant to Lew Wasserman.

Stuber was co-president of production at Universal with Mary Parent and in 2004, Stuber and Parent were named Vice Chairman of Worldwide Production for Universal Pictures.  In 2005, Universal signed a production contract with the duo under the shingle Stuber/Parent Productions.

In November 2008, it was announced that Stuber signed a five-year contract through 2013 with Universal Studios under his vanity card, Stuber Pictures.  He has been credited with producing such films as Role Models (2008), Welcome Home, Roscoe Jenkins (2008), The Kingdom (2007), You, Me and Dupree (2006), The Break-Up (2006), and Ted (2012). In 2012, Stuber Pictures was renamed to Bluegrass Films and Stuber's television unit renamed to Bluegrass Television.

Ranked No. 58 in Premiere's 2003 annual Power 100 List with Mary Parent.

Stuber joined Netflix in 2017. On January 19, 2023, Stuber was made Chairman of Film and at Netflix.

Personal life
 however, after seven months of marriage, they announced that they were divorcing.

He married Molly Sims, on September 24, 2011, at a Napa Valley Vineyard. The couple have three children: sons, Brooks Alan Stuber (born June 19, 2012) and Grey Douglas Stuber (born January 10, 2017), and daughter, Scarlett May Stuber (born March 25, 2015).

Filmography

Film

Television

References

External links

Los Angeles Business Journal
Variety News
Stuber and Parent birth a producing deal, 2005

Living people
Film producers from California
People from Granada Hills, Los Angeles
University of Arizona alumni
1968 births
Netflix people